Raelene Ann Boyle  (born 24 June 1951) is an Australian retired athlete, who represented Australia at three Olympic Games as a sprinter, winning three silver medals, and was named one of 100 National Living Treasures by the National Trust of Australia in 1998.  Boyle was diagnosed with breast cancer in 1996 and subsequently became a board member of Breast Cancer Network Australia (BCNA). In 2017, she was named a Legend in the Sport Australia Hall of Fame.

Early life
Boyle was born on 24 June 1951, the daughter of Gilbert and Irene Boyle, in Coburg, a suburb of Melbourne. She was educated at Coburg High School in Melbourne.

Sporting career
After strong performances in the 1968 Australian Championships and Olympic trials, Boyle was selected to represent Australia at the 1968 Summer Olympics in Mexico City, at the age of 16. At 17, she won a silver medal in the 200-metre sprint and placed 4th in the 100 metres. Setting world junior records in both distances, of 22.73 and 11.20 seconds. The 200-metre record lasted 12 years before being broken; the 100-metre 8 years.

Boyle competed in the 1970 British Commonwealth Games in Edinburgh, where she contributed to Australia's number one position on the medal tally with three gold medals, in the 100 and 200-metre sprints and the 4 × 100-metre relay.

At the 1972 Olympics in Munich, Boyle collected two more silver medals, in the 100-metre and 200-metre sprints. In both races, she came second to East German Renate Stecher.

In 1974, at the Christchurch British Commonwealth Games, Boyle duplicated her results at the Edinburgh Games, winning three more gold medals in the same three events. Breaking the games record in both the 100 metres 11.27 and 200 metres with a 22.50 clocking.

In January 1976, she and her team-mates beat an eight year old world record for the 4 × 200 metre relay in Brisbane.

At the 1976 Olympics in Montreal, Boyle finished fourth in the final of the 100-metre sprint, but was disqualified from the 200-metre-race for making two false starts. A video replay later showed that she had not false started on her first start. However, Boyle did receive the honour of acting as the flag bearer for the Australian team, the first woman to do so.

Boyle was unable to replicate her previous Commonwealth success at the 1978 Commonwealth Games in Edmonton, winning only a silver medal in the 100-metre sprint before withdrawing from the 200m and relay due to injury.

Boyle was selected to compete in the 1980 Olympics in Moscow but eventually withdrew from the team for what she stated were personal reasons, during the long dispute within Australian sporting circles over whether to join the USA led boycott of the Games.

Her final major competitive appearance was at the 1982 Commonwealth Games in Brisbane, where she won gold in the 400-metre sprint, and silver in the 4 × 400-metre relay.

Through her successful career, Boyle won seven gold and two silver medals at the Commonwealth Games, in addition to her three silver medals at the Olympic Games.

Many East German athletes were later revealed to have used anabolic steroids within a systematic state-sponsored doping program. Boyle has stated she believes that she would have won gold at the 1972 Olympics if not for drug use by her competitor. The IOC only banned the use of anabolic steroids in 1975.

Honours

15 June 1974 – appointed a Member of the Order of the British Empire (MBE) for services to sport.
1974 – awarded the ABC Sportsman of the Year Award
1985 – inducted into the Sport Australia Hall of Fame.
1991 – received an "award for excellence" in her sport, and for contributions to the Commonwealth Games by the Australian Commonwealth Games Association
25 September 1989 – awarded the Douglas Wilkie Medal by the Anti-Football League, for doing the least for football in the best and fairest manner.
2000 – Boyle pushed Betty Cuthbert in her wheelchair in the torch relay during the 2000 Sydney Olympics Opening Ceremony.
2000 – awarded Australian Sports Medal.
2001 – awarded Centenary Medal.
2004 – inducted into the Athletics Australia Hall of Fame.
2007 – appointed as a Member of the Order of Australia (AM) for service to the community through a range of roles with organisations that support people with cancer, particularly Breast Cancer Network Australia.
2013 – named in Australia's Top 100 Sportswomen of All Time.
2017 – upgraded to a Sport Australia Hall of Fame Legend.

Personal life
Boyle was diagnosed with cancer in 1996 and ovarian cancer in 2000 and 2001.

Boyle works to raise community awareness about breast cancer and has been a very active board member of Breast Cancer Network Australia (BCNA) since 1999.

Boyle currently lives on the Sunshine Coast in Queensland with her partner Judy Wild.

See also 

 List of Olympic medalists in athletics (women)
 Australian athletics champions (Women)

References

External links
 
 Raelene Boyle at Australian Athletics Historical Results
 
 
 
  Sporting Chance Cancer Foundation
 Raelene Boyle Australian Women's Archive Project –
 Board members: Raelene Boyle Breast Cancer Network Australia 
 Elite Sports Australia – Raelene Boyle
 National Australia Bank – Ambassadors: Raelene Boyle
 Graham Thomas – 
 Sports for women – Australia's Top 100 Sportswomen of All Time

1951 births
Living people
Australian female sprinters
Commonwealth Games gold medallists for Australia
Commonwealth Games silver medallists for Australia
Commonwealth Games medallists in athletics
Olympic athletes of Australia
Olympic silver medalists for Australia
Athletes (track and field) at the 1970 British Commonwealth Games
Athletes (track and field) at the 1974 British Commonwealth Games
Athletes (track and field) at the 1978 Commonwealth Games
Athletes (track and field) at the 1982 Commonwealth Games
Athletes (track and field) at the 1968 Summer Olympics
Athletes (track and field) at the 1972 Summer Olympics
Athletes (track and field) at the 1976 Summer Olympics
Sportswomen from Victoria (Australia)
Douglas Wilkie Medal winners
Australian Members of the Order of the British Empire
Members of the Order of Australia
Sport Australia Hall of Fame inductees
Athletes from Melbourne
Medalists at the 1972 Summer Olympics
Medalists at the 1968 Summer Olympics
Olympic silver medalists in athletics (track and field)
Olympic female sprinters
People from Coburg, Victoria
Medallists at the 1970 British Commonwealth Games
Medallists at the 1974 British Commonwealth Games
Medallists at the 1978 Commonwealth Games
Medallists at the 1982 Commonwealth Games